Woensdag (English: Wednesday) is a 2005 Dutch horror film written and directed by Bob Embregts and Jean-Paul Arends.

Plot 

Eight people are chosen to compete on Camp Slasher, a new horror-themed game show in which the contestants must complete challenges while trying to avoid a masked killer, one who is based on a local urban legend. Unbeknownst to the cast and crew of the show, an actual homicidal maniac resides in the woods where they have decided to shoot, and after massacring the program's behind-the-scenes personnel, he sets his sights on the competitors.

Cast 

 Marisa Goedhart as Vera de Jong
 Ronald van den Burg as Erik Faber
 William van der Voort as Matthijs van Weert
 Sjanett de Geus as Leanne Beekveld
 Cêfas Hoofs as Tom Cranen
 Reine Rek as Marieke Ouwerling
 Nadia Huffmeijer as Jeniffer Moonen
 Corne Heijboer as Kevin van Noordhof
 Laura Molenaar as Reizend Meisje
 Frans van der Meer as Presentatie
 Debby de Brouwer as Presentatie
 Marq van Broekhoven as Televisie Operator
 Ruud Jolie as Internet Operator
 Toine Schuurman as Assistant Techniek
 Theunis van den Broek as Nepmoordenaar #1
 Jeroen van Gelderblom as Nepmoordenaar #2
 Fred Sibelink as Producent Camp Slasher
 Patrice van der Linden as Moordenaar

Reception 

Bloody Disgusting praised the gore, criticized the screenplay and acting, and gave the film a final score of 3/5, concluding, "Woensdag may not be a great movie but it sure is entertaining and it being a relatively short movie (75 minutes) helps keep the pace and our attention up". The acting, dialogue, story, and production values were all panned by Neerlands Filmdoek, which gave Woensdag a grade of 1½ while also conceding that, "Nevertheless, there is still something to enjoy for lovers who have no objection to these shortcomings; the film is never boring and has enough amusing horror moments, fitted with the necessary gore". Top of the Flops gave Woensdag a similar commendation, noting that despite the drawbacks inherent in it being a "semi amateurish production" the film was still enjoyable as something "designed by enthusiasts for enthusiasts". Horror Neerlands, which gave the film a final grade of 2/5, panned the personality-less characters, the seemingly nonexistent script, and the slow start, but went on to admit that Woensdag did succeed at being "quite entertaining" and "still pretty fun" in spite of its flaws. The same score was awarded by Slasherpool, which summed Woensdag up with, "Disappointing slasher flick from the Netherlands which won't likely impress anyone who lives outside Holland. It's a very dull slasher and the concept has been done to death in several, much better flicks. It doesn't help that it's almost impossible to see what was going on for most of the movie either".

References

External links 

 
 Interview with Jean-Paul Arends at Top of the Flops

2005 films
2005 horror films
2005 independent films
Dutch horror films
Dutch independent films
2000s Dutch-language films
Dutch slasher films
Films about television
Films set in 2004
Films set in forests
Films set in the Netherlands
Films shot in Amsterdam
Films shot in the Netherlands
Films about mass murder
Reality television series parodies
2005 directorial debut films